Ambrose Joseph Jason Moran (August 27, 1896 – April 8, 1958) was a Canadian professional ice hockey defenceman who played 35 games in the National Hockey League for the Montreal Canadiens and Chicago Black Hawks.

Moran was born in Winnipeg, Manitoba to James and Bridget (Durkin) Moran both from Ireland.

External links

1896 births
1958 deaths
Buffalo Majors players
Canadian expatriate ice hockey players in the United States
Canadian ice hockey defencemen
Chicago Blackhawks players
Montreal Canadiens players
Regina Capitals players
St. Louis Flyers (AHA) players
Ice hockey people from Winnipeg
Tulsa Oilers (AHA) players
Vancouver Maroons players
Winnipeg Hockey Club players